Titus Books may refer to:  
Part of the Gormenghast (series) by Mervyn Peake.
Titus Books (publisher)